Radical Philosophy is a triannual peer-reviewed academic journal of critical theory and philosophy. It was established in 1972 with the purpose of providing a forum for the theoretical work which was emerging in the wake of the radical movements of the 1960s, in philosophy and other fields. The journal is edited by an "editorial collective".

Content

Besides academic articles, the journal publishes book reviews and usually some news and at least one commentary on matters of topical interest. Although not associated with any specific left-wing position, the journal is subtitled "Journal of Socialist and Feminist Philosophy" and has been broadly associated with the New Left. Editors of the journal since the early 1970s have included Marxists and feminists.

Abstracting and indexing
The journal is abstracted and indexed in:
EBSCO databases
Philosopher's Index
ProQuest databases
Scopus
Social Sciences Citation Index
Sociological Abstracts
According to the Journal Citation Reports, the journal has a 2020 impact factor of 1.952.

See also 
List of ethics journals
List of women's studies journals

References

External links

Triannual journals
English-language journals
Political philosophy journals
Publications established in 1972
Women's studies journals
Creative Commons Attribution-licensed journals